"You Like Me Too Much" is a song by the English rock band the Beatles. It was written by George Harrison, the group's lead guitarist, and released in August 1965 on the Help! album, except in North America, where it appeared on Beatles VI. The band recorded the track on 17 February that year at EMI Studios in London.

Musical characteristics
The song is in the key of G major and in 4/4 time.
There is an introduction using piano and electric piano, with Paul McCartney and George Martin playing two different piano parts on separate ends of the same Steinway grand piano.
The Steinway appears only in the song's intro and was overdubbed separately, as were McCartney's bass and Harrison's vocal overdubs.

The electric piano is a Hohner Pianet, played by John Lennon. The sound of the instrument's tremolo being switched off after the introduction can be heard.

The quick transition from G chord to a flat-III (B) is unusual, especially as its F-natural note is melodically sustained against the following D-major chord (with its concomitant F) creating what musicologist Alan Pollack terms "the most bluesy moment of the entire song".
The verse opens with three repetitions of a simple four-note motif ("Though you've gone away this morning, you'll be back again tonight") during which the chords mirror the lyrics in shifting from ii (Am chord) on "gone away" to IV (C chord) on "back again" to the tonic (G chord) on "tonight".

Cover versions
The band Glycerine covered "You Like Me Too Much" on the album Harrisongs Volume 2 – A Tribute to George Harrison.

Personnel
According to Ian MacDonald, except where noted:

The Beatles
George Harrison – double-tracked vocal, lead guitar, tambourine
John Lennon – acoustic rhythm guitar, electric piano
Paul McCartney – backing vocal, bass, piano
Ringo Starr – drums

Additional musician
George Martin – piano

References

Sources

External links
 Full lyrics for the song at the Beatles' official website

1965 songs
The Beatles songs
Songs written by George Harrison
Song recordings produced by George Martin
Songs published by Northern Songs